{{Infobox football club season
| club               = RoPS
| season             = 2016
| chairman           = Risto Niva
| manager            = Juha Malinen
| stadium            = Keskuskenttä
| league             = Veikkausliiga
| league result      = 6th| cup1               = Finnish Cup
| cup1 result        = Sixth Round vs Haka
| cup2               = League Cup
| cup2 result        = Group Stage| cup3               = UEFA Europa League
| cup3 result        = Second qualifying round vs Lokomotiva
| league topscorer   = Robert Taylor (11)
| season topscorer   = Aleksandr Kokko (13)
| highest attendance = 
| lowest attendance  = 
| average attendance = 
| pattern_la1        = 
| pattern_b1         = 
| pattern_ra1        = 
| leftarm1           = 0047AB
| body1              = 0047AB
| rightarm1          = 0047AB
| shorts1            = FFFFFF
| socks1             = 0047AB
| pattern_la2        = 
| pattern_b2         = 
| pattern_ra2        = 
| leftarm2           = FFFFFF
| body2              = FFFFFF
| rightarm2          = FFFFFF
| shorts2            = FFFFFF
| socks2             = FFFFFF
| prevseason         = 2015
| nextseason         = 2017
}}

The 2016 season is RoPS's 4th Veikkausliiga season since their promotion back to the top flight in 2012.

Squad

Out on loan

Transfers

WinterIn:Out:SummerIn:Out:'''

Competitions

Veikkausliiga

League table

Results summary

Results by matchday

Results

Finnish Cup

League Cup

UEFA Europa League

Qualifying rounds

Squad statistics

Appearances and goals

|-
|colspan="14"|Trialists:|-
|colspan="14"|Players who left RoPS during the season:''

|}

Goal scorers

Disciplinary record

References

External links
Official website

Rovaniemen Palloseura seasons
Rops